was a prominent Japanese politician who served in various cabinet positions, including Chief Cabinet Secretary, and was also Speaker of the House of Representatives of Japan. He was also the founder of the Liberal Party, and later served in senior positions in the Liberal Democratic Party of Japan.

Early life
Hori was born on 20 December 1901, in Karatsu, Saga. He graduated from Chuo University in 1924.

Career

Following a career as a journalist at Hochi Shimbun and Tokyo Nichi Nichi Shimbun, Hori was elected to the House of Representatives of Japan in 1944. While he was put into custody following Japan's defeat, he was released and duly returned to political life, becoming Secretary General of the Democratic Party. In 1950, Hori masterminded the union of the Democratic Party and the Democratic Liberal Party, resulting in the birth of the Liberal Party. In the same year, Hori was appointed by Shigeru Yoshida as Minister of Labour, and also later served under Yoshida as Chief Cabinet Secretary and Minister of Agriculture.

In the 1960s, Hori served under Eisaku Satō as Minister of Construction and then as Chief Cabinet Secretary. It was during this period that he rose to prominence within the Liberal Democratic Party itself, serving as its Secretary General and also as a senior figure within the Satō faction.

Towards the end of his life, Hori served as Director of the Administrative Management Agency in the Tanaka cabinet, and was Speaker of the House of Representatives of Japan, the latter of which he served until a month before his death. Hori died on 4 March 1979.

Honours
Grand Cordon of the Order of the Rising Sun (1972)

References

External links

Historic Japanese cabinets (in Japanese), kantei.go.jp; accessed 30 January 2018.
Historic LDP Presidents, Secretaries General, Chairs of General Affairs Committee and of Policy Research Committee (in Japanese), geocities.co.jp/WallStreet-Stock/7643/; accessed 31 March 2018

|-

|-

|-

|-

|-

|-

|-

1901 births
1979 deaths
Chuo University alumni
People from Saga Prefecture
Liberal Democratic Party (Japan) politicians
20th-century Japanese politicians
Members of the House of Representatives (Japan)
Government ministers of Japan
Ministers of Agriculture, Forestry and Fisheries of Japan
Ministers of Health and Welfare of Japan
Japanese journalists
Recipients of the Order of the Rising Sun
20th-century journalists